Toxicochlespira is a genus of sea snails, marine gastropod mollusks in the family Mangeliidae.

Species
Species within the genus Toxicochlespira include:
 Toxicochlespira pagoda Sysoev & Kantor, 1990

References

 Sysoev A.V. & Kantor Y. (1990) A new genus and species of "Cochlespira-like" turrids. Apex 5(1-2): 1-6

External links
  Bouchet, P.; Kantor, Y. I.; Sysoev, A.; Puillandre, N. (2011). A new operational classification of the Conoidea (Gastropoda). Journal of Molluscan Studies. 77(3): 273-308

 
Monotypic gastropod genera